The Dark Horse is an international literary magazine based in Scotland. Founded in 1995 by Scottish poet Gerry Cambridge, it publishes British, Irish, and American poetry as well as literary criticism and interviews. Past contributors include Wendy Cope, Douglas Dunn, Vicki Feaver, Anthony Hecht, Kay Ryan, Matthew Sweeney, Robert Nye, and Richard Wilbur.

According to Malcolm Ballin of Cardiff University, The Dark Horse is Scotland's "best-established little magazine." In 2005, the magazine celebrated its twentieth anniversary with launch events in Edinburgh, London, and New York. On its thirtieth anniversary, Alan Taylor wrote that the longevity of the magazine is "no small achievement."

References

External links 
 

Literary magazines published in Scotland
Poetry magazines published in the United Kingdom
Magazines established in 1965
Biannual magazines published in the United Kingdom